This is a list of television specials of the Japanese media franchise Lupin III, based on the manga series by Monkey Punch that debuted in 1967. In a tradition that began in 1989 with Bye Bye, Lady Liberty, every year since until 2013 featured a new 90 minute Lupin III anime television special that aired on NTV at 9:03 on Friday evening. Since then, they have been released irregularly.

Each television special features its own plot, but the general theme centers on the adventures of Arsène Lupin III, the grandson of Arsène Lupin, the gentleman thief of Maurice Leblanc's series of novels. He is joined by Daisuke Jigen, crack-shot and Lupin's closest ally; Fujiko Mine, the femme fatale and Lupin's love interest who works against Lupin more often than with him; and Goemon Ishikawa XIII, a master swordsman and descendant of Ishikawa Goemon, the legendary Japanese bandit. Lupin is often chased by Inspector Koichi Zenigata, the rather cynical detective who has made it his life mission to catch Lupin. The 2009 Lupin III vs. Detective Conan special is, as the title suggests, a crossover between Lupin III and Detective Conan and as such features characters from both series.

Manga Entertainment released the first special on VHS in the United Kingdom and Australia in 1996 as Goodbye Lady Liberty, using an English dub that they had created in London with an American-British cast. Funimation purchased the North American distribution rights to specials five through twelve in 2002, in a package that also included the two theatrical films Farewell to Nostradamus and Dead or Alive. They re-titled several of the animations for their release. North American distributor Discotek Media released Episode 0: The First Contact in 2010, the first and second television specials in 2014 (with the former including its UK dub), and the third and fourth in 2015, and the fifth, thirteenth and fifteenth specials in 2016 (with the fifth including its Funimation dub). They also released the Lupin III vs. Detective Conan special and its theatrical film sequel on October 27, 2015. Discotek released the 22nd special in 2019, and the 21st and 26th in 2020.

Specials

Production notes
While recording Orders to Assassinate Lupin in 1993, Lupin's voice actor, Yasuo Yamada, took a sudden illness, and his standing became unstable. By the last part of the recording, Yasuo recorded his voice while he was in a chair. Yamada went on to reprise the role one last time in Burn, Zantetsuken! The following year, however, his health continued to decline during the recording. He died of a brain hemorrhage in 1995, at the age of 62. Kanichi Kurita took over the role of Lupin that same year.
2007's Elusiveness of the Fog, as well as being one of the annual Lupin TV specials, also aired as a tribute to the 40th anniversary of the Lupin III manga. Just as the OVA Return of the Magician brought back an old villain in recognition of the 30th anniversary of the anime, the character of Mamou had previously appeared in both a story in the original Lupin III manga and the thirteenth episode of the first anime series. It should be noted he is treated in this special as if Lupin's gang had never met him before.
2011's Blood Seal - Eternal Mermaid brought new voice actors for Fujiko, Zenigata and Goemon for the first time in 16 years. Miyuki Sawashiro took over Fujiko from Eiko Masuyama, Daisuke Namikawa took over Goemon from Makio Inoue, and Kōichi Yamadera took over Zenigata from Gorō Naya. They have continued to voice the characters in all other media since.

Reception
The Lupin III television specials released by Funimation have received reviews varying from positive to mixed. The most well-received seems to be Island of Assassins, with Chris Beveridge of Mania.com describing it as "the best non-TV Lupin experience ... since The Castle of Cagliostro", Missed by a Dollar received an eight out of ten rating by IGN's Jeremy Mullin, who stated it starts off as seemingly a simple heist film, but turns out to have plenty of twists. The least well-received of Funimation's releases is Secret of the Twilight Gemini, which received mixed reviews due to the animation and its B movie-style plot. Mania.com gave 2002's Episode 0: The First Contact an A+ and hailed it as the best TV special made to date.

In 500 Essential Anime Movies Helen McCarthy called Liberty her personal favourite of the Lupin TV specials. She describes it as "light, funny and entertaining" and "terrific entertainment".

See also

 Lupin III
 List of Lupin III Part I episodes
 List of Lupin the Third Part II episodes
 List of Lupin III Part III episodes
 List of Lupin III: The Woman Called Fujiko Mine episodes
 List of Lupin III Part IV episodes
 List of Lupin III Part V episodes

References
General

Specific

External links
 

Anime television films
Television Specials
Funimation
Lupin the Third films
Discotek Media
Lists of television specials
TMS Entertainment

it:Lupin III (anime)#TV Special